|}

The Westow Stakes is a Listed flat horse race in Great Britain open to horses aged three years only.
It is run at York over a distance of 5 furlongs, and it is scheduled to take place each year in May.

The race was first run in 2009 and was awarded Listed status in 2015.

Winners

See also 
Horse racing in Great Britain
List of British flat horse races

References

Flat horse races for three-year-olds
York Racecourse
Flat races in Great Britain
Recurring sporting events established in 2009
2009 establishments in England